The Team event competition at the 2022 World Aquatics Championships was held on 29 June 2022.

Results
The event was started at 14:30.

References

Team event